Apesantius was an epithet of the god Zeus from Greek mythology, under which he had a temple on Mount Apesas (modern Mount Phoukas) near Nemea, where Perseus was said to have first offered sacrifices to him.

Notes

Epithets of Zeus